Winding is a common name for an electromagnetic coil.

Winding may also refer to:

People with the name Winding:

 Alberte Winding (born 1963), Danish singer and actress
 Andréas Winding (1928–1977), French cinematographer
 August Winding (1835–1899), Danish pianist and composer
 Johannes Winding Harbitz (1831–1917), Norwegian politician
 Kai Winding (1922–1983), Danish trombonist and jazz composer
 Nicolas Winding Refn (born 1970), Danish filmmaker
 Romain Winding (born 1951), French cinematographer
 Victor Winding (1929–2014), British actor

Other uses:

 Winding number, an integer representing the total number of times that a curve travels counterclockwise around a point
 Winding hole, a widened section of canal used for turning boats
 Winding, the lowering and raising of men and equipment in mining
 Getting the wind knocked out of you

See also
Wind (disambiguation)
Wound (disambiguation)
Wingdings